Roland Hermann Kossivi Amouzou  (born 18 December 1994) is a Togolese professional footballer who plays as a defender for Ghanaian Premier League side Ashanti Gold.

Career 
Before moving to Ashanti Gold in 2017, Amouzou played for Sekondi Hasaacas. Since 2017 he has plied his trade with Obuasi-based club Ashanti Gold. He was a member of the squad that played in the 2020–21 CAF Confederation Cup.

References

External links 

 
 

1994 births
Living people
Association football defenders
Togolese footballers
Ghana Premier League players
Sekondi Hasaacas F.C. players
Ashanti Gold SC players
21st-century Togolese people